The Chow test, proposed by econometrician Gregory Chow in 1960, is a test of whether the true coefficients in two linear regressions on different data sets are equal. In econometrics, it is most commonly used in time series analysis to test for the presence of a structural break at a period which can be assumed to be known a priori (for instance, a major historical event such as a war). In program evaluation, the Chow test is often used to determine whether the independent variables have different impacts on different subgroups of the population.

Illustrations

First Chow Test
Suppose that we model our data as

If we split our data into two groups, then we have

and

Then the Chow test statistic is

The same result can be achieved via dummy variables.

Consider the two data sets which are being compared. Firstly there is the 'primary' data set i={1,...,} and the 'secondary' data set i={+1,...,n}. Then there is the union of these two sets: i={1,...,n}. If there is no structural change between the primary and secondary data sets a regression can be run over the union without the issue of biased estimators arising.  

Consider the regression: 

Which is run over i={1,...,n}.

D is a dummy variable taking a value of 1 for i={+1,...,n} and 0 otherwise.

If both data sets can be explained fully by  then there is no use in the dummy variable as the data set is explained fully by the restricted equation. That is, under the assumption of no structural change we have a null and alternative hypothesis of:

The null hypothesis of joint insignificance of D can be run as an F-test with  degrees of freedom (DoF). That is: .

Remarks

 The global sum of squares (SSE) is often called the Restricted Sum of Squares (RSSM) as we basically test a constrained model where we have  assumptions (with  the number of regressors).
 Some software like SAS will use a predictive Chow test when the size of a subsample is less than the number of regressors.

References

External links

Computing the Chow statistic, Chow and Wald tests, Chow tests: Series of FAQ explanations from the Stata Corporation at https://www.stata.com/support/faqs/
: Series of FAQ explanations from the SAS Corporation

Time series statistical tests
Regression diagnostics